Hasimara railway station is the railway station lying on New Jalpaiguri–Alipurduar–Samuktala Road line and serving the town of Hasimara in Alipurduar district in the Indian state of West Bengal.

Location 
This railway station is the closest railway station from Bhutan. The town of Phuntsholing in Bhutan is just 18 kilometres away from Hasimara Railway Station.
This railway station lies on NJP Alipurduar line which is an active elephant corridor.

Trains
Major trains running from Hasimara railway station are as follows:
New Jalpaiguri–Alipurduar Tourist Special.
Lokmanya Tilak Terminus–Kamakhya Karmabhoomi Express.
Dr. Ambedkar Nagar–Kamakhya Express
Delhi-Alipurduar Mahananda Express
Alipurduar - Secunderabad Express
Sealdah-Alipurduar Kanchan Kanya Express
Kamakhya-Patna Capital Express
Ranchi–Kamakhya Express
Siliguri–Alipurduar Intercity Express
Siliguri Bamanhat Intercity Express.
Siliguri–Dhubri Intercity Express

Administration 
This railway station also serves the town of Jaigaon. and lies under Alipurduar railway division of Northeast Frontier Railway zone.

References

Railway stations in West Bengal
Alipurduar railway division
Railway stations in Alipurduar district